Jaime Gomez or Taboo is an American singer, actor, and rapper best known as a member of the Black Eyed Peas.

Jaime Gomez may also refer to:
Jaime Gomez (golfer) (born 1967), American golfer
Jaime Gómez (Mexican footballer) (1929–2008), Mexican football goalkeeper
Jaime Gómez (Salvadoran footballer) (born 1980), Salvadoran footballer
Jaime Manuel Gómez (born 1972), Mexican American boxer
Jaime P. Gomez, American film and television actor